Habermehl Rock, Livingston Island
 Hadzhi Dimitar Peak, Graham Coast
 Hadzhiev Glacier, Alexander Island
 Hall Cove, Nelson Island
 Haralambiev Island, South Orkney Islands
 Hariton Peak, Sentinel Range
 Harmanli Cove, Tower Island  
 Haskovo Cove, Greenwich Island
 Hayduta Buttress, Fallières Coast  
 Hazarbasanov Ridge, Trinity Peninsula  
 Hebrizelm Hill, Greenwich Island  
 Heksagon Tarn, Livingston Island
 Helis Nunatak, Livingston Island
 Hemimont Plateau, Loubet Coast
 Hemus Peak, Livingston Island
 Herbst Nunatak, Alexander Island  
 Heros Peninsula, Foyn Coast
 Herring Point, Rugged Island  
 Hervé Island, Biscoe Islands
 Hesperides Hill, Livingston Island  
 Hisarya Cove, Smith Island  
 Hitar Petar Nunatak, Trinity Peninsula 
 Hitov Spur, Oscar II Coast
 Hitrino Ridge, Oscar II Coast
 Mount Hleven, Sentinel Range
 Hoatsin Island, Wilhelm Archipelago
 Hochstetter Peak, Trinity Peninsula 
 Hodges Knoll, Sentinel Range
 Hondius Inlet, Bowman Coast 
 Hrabar Nunatak, Greenwich Island  
 Huhla Col, Trinity Peninsula  
 Huma Nunatak, Trinity Peninsula
 Humar Peak, Oscar II Coast
 Hvarchil Point, Brabant Island
 Hvoyna Cove, Davis Coast
 Mount Hypothesis, Nordenskjöld Coast

See also 
 Bulgarian toponyms in Antarctica

External links 
 Bulgarian Antarctic Gazetteer
 SCAR Composite Gazetteer of Antarctica
 Antarctic Digital Database (ADD). Scale 1:250000 topographic map of Antarctica with place-name search.
 L. Ivanov. Bulgarian toponymic presence in Antarctica. Polar Week at the National Museum of Natural History in Sofia, 2–6 December 2019

Bibliography 
 J. Stewart. Antarctica: An Encyclopedia. Jefferson, N.C. and London: McFarland, 2011. 1771 pp.  
 L. Ivanov. Bulgarian Names in Antarctica. Sofia: Manfred Wörner Foundation, 2021. Second edition. 539 pp.  (in Bulgarian)
 G. Bakardzhieva. Bulgarian toponyms in Antarctica. Paisiy Hilendarski University of Plovdiv: Research Papers. Vol. 56, Book 1, Part A, 2018 – Languages and Literature, pp. 104-119 (in Bulgarian)
 L. Ivanov and N. Ivanova. Bulgarian names. In: The World of Antarctica. Generis Publishing, 2022. pp. 114-115. 

Antarctica
 
Bulgarian toponyms in Antarctica
Names of places in Antarctica